Luis Mariano Proenza (born Dec. 22, 1944) is an American academic, and the former president of The University of Akron. He was a member of two advisory committees to US presidents.

Biography
Proenza holds a bachelor's degree in psychology from Emory University (1965), a master's degree in psychology from Ohio State University (1966) and a doctorate in neurobiology from the University of Minnesota (1971).

Proenza was president of The University of Akron from 1999 until 2014. In 2014, he was awarded the H. Peter Burg Economic Leadership Award by the Greater Akron Chamber of Commerce for his accomplishments as president, which included expanding the University's footprint into downtown and the completion of 21 new facilities, 18 renovations/additions, and 34 acres of green space. Proenza took a sabbatical leave from the university from 2014 to 2016. He returned as a full-time tenured professor in the Office of Academic Affairs in 2016.

Proenza was on the United States President's Council of Advisors on Science and Technology under the George W. Bush administration to enable the office of the president to receive advice from the private and academic sectors on technology, scientific research priorities, and math and science education. In 2013, President Barack Obama appointed Proenza and 18 othersto the Advanced Manufacturing Partnership Steering Committee 2.0, created to help strengthen the U.S. advanced manufacturing sector.

References

External links
 The University of Akron official biography

1944 births
Living people
Emory University alumni
University of Minnesota College of Science and Engineering alumni
Presidents of the University of Akron
Ohio State University Graduate School alumni
Mexican emigrants to the United States
University of Georgia faculty